Arta, ARTA, or Artà may refer to:

Places

Djibouti
 Arta, Djibouti, a regional capital city in southeastern Djibouti
 Arta Mountains, a mountain range in Djibouti
 Arta Region, Djibouti

Greece
 Arta, Greece, a regional capital city in northwestern Greece
 Arta (regional unit), Greece
 Ambracian Gulf, also known as the Gulf of Arta, a gulf of the Ionian Sea

Elsewhere
 Arta, Azerbaijan, a village and municipality
 Artà, an independent municipality and village on the Spanish Balearic island of Majorca
 Arta Terme, a comune (municipality) in Friuli-Venezia Giulia, Italy
 Nartë (Arta in Greek), Albania
 Medieval Despotate of Arta (1358–1416) in modern Albania

Organizations
Arta Industrial Group, a multinational conglomerate headquartered in Tehran, Iran
Arta FM, first Kurdish radio station in Syria
Auckland Regional Transport Authority, New Zealand
Autobacs Racing Team Aguri, a Japanese auto racing team
CE Artà, a football club in Spain's Balearic Islands

Other
Arta (given name)
Arta (crater), a crater on Mars
Arta (moth), a genus of moths
Arta language of the northern Philippines
Asha (also called Arta), a concept of rightness and divine order in ancient Aryan cultures

See also
Artas (disambiguation)
Alta (disambiguation)
Arth (disambiguation)